Susan Paddack (born in Baytown, Texas) is a Democratic politician and former educator in the U.S. state of Oklahoma. She served in the Oklahoma State Senate representing District 13, which includes Pontotoc and Hughes counties and parts of Garvin and Coal counties, since 2004. As of 2013, she served as Minority Whip and Vice Chair of the Judiciary Committee.

Paddack was a candidate for the role of Oklahoma Superintendent of Public Instruction, but ultimately failed to win the election against her Republican opponent, Janet Barresi.

Prior to her political career, Paddack was a science teacher and adjunct professor.

Early life
Susan Paddack was born in Baytown, Texas. Her father was Vice President of the General Telephone Company and her mother was a stay-at-home mom. After graduating from high school in Brownfield, Texas, Paddack went on to earn a bachelor's degree in Education from the University of Colorado after attending Texas Tech University for two years and a master's of education degree from East Central University. Paddack and her husband moved to Ada, Oklahoma in the early 1980s. Paddack was the first person in her family to obtain a college education, let alone a master's degree.

Educational career
Paddack was Director of Local Education Foundation Outreach for the Oklahoma Foundation for Excellence for over nine years. She was also a science teacher in secondary schools as well as adjunct faculty member in the Education Department at East Central University.

Political career
In 2004 Paddack was elected to the Oklahoma State Senate where she currently serves. While campaigning, Paddack commonly told constituents that she was a "Texan by birth but an Oklahoman by choice." Paddack was named "50 Women Making a Difference" in Oklahoma by the Journal Record in 2004  and 2008.

Paddack ran for Oklahoma Superintendent of Public Instruction in the 2010 election, but was defeated by Republican Janet Barresi.

Senate Committees
Appropriations
Appropriation Subcommittee on General Government and Transportation
Appropriation Subcommittee on Public Safety and Judiciary
Education
Finance
Pensions
Public Safety
Transportation

References

External links
Women of the Oklahoma Legislature Oral History Project -- OSU Library
Project Vote Smart - Susan Paddack (OK) profile
Follow the Money - Susan Paddack
2008 2006 2004 campaign contributions

Living people
Democratic Party Oklahoma state senators
Women state legislators in Oklahoma
People from Ada, Oklahoma
21st-century American politicians
21st-century American women politicians
Year of birth missing (living people)
People from Baytown, Texas
University of Colorado Boulder alumni
East Central University alumni
East Central University faculty
American women academics
Candidates in the 2010 United States elections